Henry Aldrich, Editor is a 1942 American comedy film directed by Hugh Bennett and written by Muriel Roy Bolton and Val Burton. The film stars Jimmy Lydon, Charles Smith, John Litel, Olive Blakeney, Rita Quigley and Vaughan Glaser. The film was released in September 1942, by Paramount Pictures.

Plot
Henry Aldrich is the newspaper editor at his high school, his objective is to double newspaper circulation. Henry finds his chance when a warehouse fire occurs and he meets a newspaper man that teaches him how to manipulate stories so they are more interesting. After hinting that there was something sinister about the fire and releasing the newspaper, the story spreads fast. As he continues to cover fires, people start believing he is the arsonist.

Cast 

Jimmy Lydon as Henry Aldrich
Charles Smith as Dizzy Stevens
John Litel as Mr. Samuel W. Aldrich
Olive Blakeney as Mrs. Alice Aldrich
Rita Quigley as Martha Daley
Vaughan Glaser as Mr. Bradley
Charles Halton as Elias Noonan
Francis Pierlot as Nero Smith
Cliff Clark as Fire Chief
Fern Emmett as Miss Bryant
Maude Eburne as Mrs. Norris
William Halligan as Norman Kenly
Ray Walker as Jack Lewis
Oscar O'Shea as Judge Sanders
Leon Belasco as Leon Brink
Chester Clute as Clerk in drug store
Paul Matthews as Robert Allen
Edgar Dearing as McLean
Matt McHugh as Charlie
Frank M. Thomas as Mayor

References

External links 
 

1942 films
The Aldrich Family films
American black-and-white films
Paramount Pictures films
American comedy films
1942 comedy films
Films produced by Sol C. Siegel
1940s English-language films
Films directed by Hugh Bennett
1940s American films